For other places named Coldwater in Texas, see Coldwater, Texas.

Coldwater is a ghost town in Wood County, Texas, USA. It was founded in 1880. There is a church and a cemetery.

References

1880 establishments in Texas
Ghost towns in Texas
Unincorporated communities in Wood County, Texas
Unincorporated communities in Texas